Damien Seguin (born 3 September 1979 in Briançon) is a French sailor. He is a paralympic champion and was a Nominee for World Sailing - World Sailor of the Year Awards. With sailing no longer on the Paralympic agenda he has pursued offshore yacht racing, competing in the 2020–2021 Vendée Globe a solo round the world race.

Sailing Highlights

Paralympics

World Championships

Offshore Sailing
After sailing was removed from the paralympic sailing competition Damien focused on Oceanic short handed sailing having sailing the feeder Class 40 leading to him competing in an IMOCA 60 in the 2020–2021 Vendée Globe.

References

External links
 
 
 
 
 

1979 births
Living people
Sportspeople from Hautes-Alpes
French male sailors (sport)
People from Briançon
Paralympic gold medalists for France
Paralympic silver medalists for France
Paralympic medalists in sailing
Paralympic sailors of France
Medalists at the 2004 Summer Paralympics
Medalists at the 2008 Summer Paralympics
Medalists at the 2016 Summer Paralympics
Sailors at the 2004 Summer Paralympics
Sailors at the 2008 Summer Paralympics
Sailors at the 2012 Summer Paralympics
Sailors at the 2016 Summer Paralympics
2.4 Metre class sailors
2.4 Metre class world champions
Class 40 class sailors
IMOCA 60 class sailors
World champions in sailing for France
French Vendee Globe sailors
2020 Vendee Globe sailors
Vendée Globe finishers
Single-handed circumnavigating sailors